Mehdi Sahabi ( 4 February 1944 in Qasvin (Iran) – November 9, 2009 in Paris (France) ) was an Iranian translator, painter, and writer. Born in the provincial Iranian capitol of Qazvin in 1944, Sahabi translated novels originally in English, French, and Italian into Persian. He left his studies at the Fine Arts Faculty of the University of Tehran and Rome University of Fine Arts unfinished.

His translation of Marcel Proust's In Search of Lost Time, which he spent 11 years on, is considered his finest. He also translated Gustave Flaubert's Madame Bovary and Sentimental Education, Charles Dickens' David Copperfield, All Men are Mortal by Simone de Beauvoir, Stendhal's The Red and the Black, The Baron in the Trees by Italo Calvino and Louis-Ferdinand Céline's Death on Credit''.

Sahabi was awarded Iran's Book of the Year award, after which no translator won for 18 years. He died in Paris of a heart attack on November 9, 2009. His funeral took place in Tehran.

References

1944 births
2009 deaths
20th-century Persian-language writers
Iranian translators
20th-century translators
Iran's Book of the Year Awards recipients